Ganiel Akrisha Atun Krishnan (born September 9, 1994) is an Indian-Filipino beauty queen, journalist, and sportscaster.

She is also a courtside reporter for the UAAP's broadcast coverage of ABS-CBN Sports+Action, who report for her school, the FEU Tamaraws varsity teams.

Personal life
Ganiel Akrisha Atun Krishnan was born on September 9, 1994, to an Indian-Singaporean father and a Filipino mother. Krishnan began her entertainment career as a finalist of the now-defunct noontime show Happy Yipee Yehey!s segment "My Girl", before being discovered by Johnny Manahan, and later signed for Star Magic. She has also appeared in Maalaala Mo Kaya and Oh My G! in supporting roles, and was part a finalist of the Bright Young Manila of Chalk Magazine in 2015.

She was a track and field athlete in her high school days at Paco Catholic School.

Pageantry

Miss Manila 2016
Krishnan was named 2nd Runner-Up of Miss Manila 2016, where she was a crowd favorite.

Mutya ng Pilipinas 2016
She was crowned as Mutya ng Pilipinas Asia-Pacific 2016 during its coronation night held at the Newport Performing Arts Theater, Resorts World Manila, Pasay on July 30, 2016.

Aside from the title, Krishnan was also awarded the Darling of the Press, Best in Talent, Mutya ng Sheridan Beach Resort, Mutya ng Rain or Shine, Hannah's Best in Swimsuit, Mutya ng Hotel 101, Mutya ng Camera Club of the Philippines and Mutya ng Inglot special awards.

Miss Asia Pacific International 2016
She represented the Philippines in the Miss Asia Pacific International 2016 in Puerto Princesa City, Philippines and finished 2nd Runner-Up.

Miss World Philippines 2021
In May 2021, she was confirmed as an official candidate for the Miss World Philippines 2021 pageant that will take place on August 8, but later postponed.

On October 4, she was crowned as the 2nd princess of the said pageant. A day after, she give up her title as 2nd princess. Krishnan decided to focus on her profession as a media personnel.

Janelle Lewis of Angeles City, Pampanga assumed her title as 2nd princess of Miss World Philippines 2021.

Filmography

Television

Film

See also

Athena Imperial
Cathy Untalan
Diane Querrer
Emma Tiglao
Tina Marasigan

References

External links

 (Resigned)

Star Magic
Mutya ng Pilipinas winners
Filipino film actresses
Filipino television sportscasters
Living people
People from Zamboanga City
Filipino people of Indian descent
1994 births
Miss World Philippines winners
Filipino television actresses